Christian Richard Thomas (7 February 1896 – 4 October 1970) was a Danish gymnast who competed in the 1920 Summer Olympics. He was part of the Danish team, which won the gold medal in the gymnastics men's team, free system event in 1920.

References

Danish male artistic gymnasts
Gymnasts at the 1920 Summer Olympics
Olympic gymnasts of Denmark
Olympic gold medalists for Denmark
1896 births
1970 deaths
Olympic medalists in gymnastics
Medalists at the 1920 Summer Olympics